Children's World is a children's magazine founded by K. Shankar Pillai, a well known cartoonist, to be a forum for writings by children, budding as well as established authors. The magazine is published in English. It has many young readers all around the country and mainly features writing by children. It is based in New Delhi.

History
The magazine had its beginnings in the Shankar's International Children's Competition, an event conducted by K. Shankar Pillai since 1949. He decided in January 1968 to publish the entries to the competition in a weekly illustrated periodical. The magazine switched to become a monthly in March 1972. The magazine was started and is owned by Children's Book Trust.

Editions
It issues two special issues, in April and in November. The November issue comprises prizewinning entries from the annual Your Pages Competition for children in the age group of 5–16 years. It is published to coincide with the celebration of Children's Day in India in November. The magazine is currently edited by Geeta Menon. There have been 52 volumes so far. The magazine includes many activities like Spot the Differences, Dot-to-Dot, crossword puzzle, Quizathon, which are published inside every issue. Children are given prizes on submitting correct entries of such puzzles. It is liked by a large majority of students, and is even recommended by school teachers. It is a good platform for budding poets and authors to show their skills to others.

References

External links
 Official website

1968 establishments in Delhi
English-language magazines published in India
Children's magazines published in India
Monthly magazines published in India
Weekly magazines published in India
Magazines established in 1967
Magazines published in Delhi